Musaabad (also Romanized as Mūsáābād and Moosa Abad) is a village in Azadegan Rural District, in the Central District of Rafsanjan County, Kerman Province, Iran. At the 2006 census, its population was 222, in 55 families.

References 

Populated places in Rafsanjan County